Ronaldo Tres (born February 13, 1987 in Rodeio Bonito), is a Brazilian defensive midfielder. He currently plays for Figueirense.

Contract
2010 - Corinthians 
2010. 5 - 2011. 5 Guarani (Loan) 
2011. 5 - 2011. 7 Corinthians B 
2011. 7 - 2011. 10 Guarani (Loan)

External links
CBF

1987 births
Living people
Brazilian footballers
Club Athletico Paranaense players
Figueirense FC players
Sport Club Corinthians Paulista players
Rio Branco Sport Club players
Guarani FC players
Clube Atlético Bragantino players
Association football midfielders